The 1989 NASCAR Winston Cup Series was the 41st season of professional stock car racing in the United States and the 18th modern-era Cup season. It began February 12 and ended November 19. Rusty Wallace of Blue Max Racing won the championship. This was the first year that every Winston Cup race had flag to flag coverage, with almost all of them being televised live.

The 1989 season marked the end of the first of two tire wars between Goodyear and Hoosier, with Hoosier leaving NASCAR shortly after Goodyear debuted their new radial tires.

Also, 1989 was the first season without Bobby Allison, Benny Parsons, and Cale Yarborough.

1989 NASCAR Winston Cup Series Drivers

Schedule

Races

Busch Clash 

The Busch Clash, an annual invitational event for all winners of the Busch Pole award from the previous season, was held February 12 at Daytona International Speedway. Ken Schrader drew for the pole.

Top Ten Results

 25-Ken Schrader
 28-Davey Allison
 11-Terry Labonte
 5-Geoff Bodine
 4-Rick Wilson
 27-Rusty Wallace
 6-Mark Martin
 17-Darrell Waltrip
 75-Morgan Shepherd
 66-Rick Mast

Gatorade 125s 

The Gatorade 125s, a pair of qualifying races for the Daytona 500, were held February 16 at Daytona International Speedway. Ken Schrader and Darrell Waltrip won the poles for each event, respectively.

Race One Top Ten Results

 25-Ken Schrader
 75-Morgan Shepherd
 6-Mark Martin
 55-Phil Parsons
 7-Alan Kulwicki
 66-Rick Mast
 9-Jody Ridley
 10-Ken Bouchard -1
 45-Joe Ruttman -1
 71-Dave Marcis -1

Race Two Top Ten Results

 11-Terry Labonte
 94-Sterling Marlin
 3-Dale Earnhardt
 5-Geoff Bodine
 33-Harry Gant
 16-Larry Pearson
 28-Davey Allison
 17-Darrell Waltrip -1
 15-Brett Bodine -1
 29-Dale Jarrett -1

Jody Ridley substituted for Bill Elliott, who injured his wrist in a practice crash.

Daytona 500 
The Daytona 500 was held February 19th. Ken Schrader won the pole.

Top Ten Results
 17-Darrell Waltrip
 25-Ken Schrader
 3-Dale Earnhardt
 5-Geoff Bodine
 55-Phil Parsons
 66-Rick Mast*
 7-Alan Kulwicki
 4-Rick Wilson
 11-Terry Labonte
 23-Eddie Bierschwale

Darrell Waltrip stretched his fuel for 53 laps, and won the Daytona 500 for the first time in his career, after 17 tries.

Goodwrench 500 

The Goodwrench 500 was held March 5 at North Carolina Motor Speedway. Rusty Wallace won the pole.

Top Ten Results

 27-Rusty Wallace
 7-Alan Kulwicki
 3-Dale Earnhardt
 5-Geoff Bodine
 6-Mark Martin
 28-Davey Allison
 94-Sterling Marlin
 83-Lake Speed
 88-Greg Sacks
 31-Jim Sauter

Rusty Wallace became the first driver to claim the Unocal 76 Challenge. After one rollover, and bonus money added at the season ending banquet, Wallace received an additional $22,800 for winning from the pole.

Motorcraft Quality Parts 500 

The Motorcraft Quality Parts 500 was held March 19 at Atlanta International Raceway. The No. 7 of Alan Kulwicki won the pole.

Top Ten Results

 17-Darrell Waltrip
 3-Dale Earnhardt
 84-Dick Trickle
 42-Kyle Petty
 94-Sterling Marlin
 4-Rick Wilson
 21-Neil Bonnett
 57-Hut Stricklin
 29-Dale Jarrett
 75-Morgan Shepherd

Failed to qualify: #36-H. B. Baily, #69-Lee Raymond, #70-J. D. McDuffie, Rodney Combs, Rick Jeffrey

Richard Petty was a factor among the leaders, and led 9 laps. But during a pit stop, the gas can leaked fuel onto the exhaust pipe, and started a bad pit fire. Crew member Robert Callicutt suffered second degree burns over 40% of his body and was hospitalized. Petty was forced to drop out of the race. The incident led to new rules regarding crew member fire protection, and newly designed gas can nozzles to prevent leakage. In addition, all pit road reporters for ABC and ESPN would be required to wear fire protected suits for future races telecast by either network.

Pontiac Excitement 400 

The Pontiac Excitement 400 was held March 26 at Richmond International Raceway. The No. 5 of Geoff Bodine won the pole.

Top Ten Results

 27-Rusty Wallace
 7-Alan Kulwicki
 3-Dale Earnhardt
 26-Ricky Rudd
 28-Davey Allison
 16-Larry Pearson
 17-Darrell Waltrip
 94-Sterling Marlin
 2-Ernie Irvan
 9-Bill Elliott

Failed to qualify: 43-Richard Petty

This race was scheduled for the weekend after the Daytona 500 (February 26), but snow fell in Richmond and blanketed the Speedway. The race was postponed a month, and in subsequent seasons, the spring Richmond race was moved later and later into the season. It is one of the rare times a NASCAR race has been held on Easter Sunday, a weekend that has not had an originally scheduled NASCAR Cup race in the modern era.
After qualifying for 513 consecutive races, Richard Petty failed to make the field for this race for the first time since the 1971 Georgia 500. He wrecked his primary car during practice, and could not get the backup car up to speed. His consecutive starts record would stand until the 1996 First Union 400 when Terry Labonte broke the record. Petty's failure to qualify would not be this isolated race however as he would fail to qualify for three additional races later in the season. This would eventually lead to the past champion's provisional being added for former Cup champions failing to qualify on speed or normal provisionals.

TranSouth 500 

The TranSouth 500 was held April 2 at Darlington Raceway. Mark Martin won the pole.

Top Ten Results

 33-Harry Gant
 28-Davey Allison
 5-Geoff Bodine
 6-Mark Martin
 94-Sterling Marlin
 9-Bill Elliott
 7-Alan Kulwicki
 27-Rusty Wallace
 30-Michael Waltrip
 83-Lake Speed

This was Harry Gant's first victory since the 1985 Holly Farms 400.

Valleydale Meats 500 

The Valleydale Meats 500 was held April 9 at Bristol International Raceway. Mark Martin won the pole.

Top Ten Results

 27-Rusty Wallace
 17-Darrell Waltrip
 5-Geoff Bodine
 28-Davey Allison
 84-Dick Trickle
 6-Mark Martin
 88-Greg Sacks
 26-Ricky Rudd
 9-Bill Elliott
 33-Harry Gant

Failed to qualify: #40-Ben Hess, #43-Richard Petty, #52-Jimmy Means, #70-J. D. McDuffie, #71-Dave Marcis, Steve Seligman

This would be Greg Sacks' best finish of 1989.
This was the final NASCAR start for team owner Buddy Arrington with Brad Teague as his final driver. Teague would finish 17th, 12 laps down to the winner.
This race would set the all time caution record for the NASCAR Cup Series; this record would hold up for seventeen years before being beaten by the 2005 Coca-Cola 600.

First Union 400 
The First Union 400 was held April 16 at North Wilkesboro Speedway. Rusty Wallace won the pole.

Top Ten Results

 3-Dale Earnhardt
 7-Alan Kulwicki
 6-Mark Martin
 84-Dick Trickle
 11-Terry Labonte
 26-Ricky Rudd
 5-Geoff Bodine
 17-Darrell Waltrip
 27-Rusty Wallace
 2-Ernie Irvan

Failed to qualify: 8-Bobby Hillin Jr., 43-Richard Petty, 55-Phil Parsons*, 70-J. D. McDuffie, 04-Bill Meacham, Jerry O'Neil, Kevin Evans, Mark Walbridge

The race was notable for Goodyear debuting their new radial tires and Dale Earnhardt winning the race with them.
Phil Parsons' team purchased the No. 60 in this event in order to race. He finished 12th, 6 laps down.

Pannill Sweatshirts 500 

The Pannill Sweatshirts 500 was held April 23 at Martinsville Speedway. The No. 5 of Geoff Bodine won the pole.

Top Ten Results

 17-Darrell Waltrip
 3-Dale Earnhardt
 84-Dick Trickle
 4-Rick Wilson
 11-Terry Labonte
 6-Mark Martin
 25-Ken Schrader
 94-Sterling Marlin
 71-Dave Marcis
 21-Neil Bonnett
• This would mark the final race as well as race victory for the older Chevrolet Monte Carlo body style. The new Chevrolet Lumina would debut the next week at Talladega Superspeedway.

Winston 500 

The Winston 500 was held May 7 at Alabama International Motor Speedway. Mark Martin won the pole.

Top Ten Results

 28-Davey Allison
 11-Terry Labonte
 6-Mark Martin
 75-Morgan Shepherd
 17-Darrell Waltrip
 25-Ken Schrader
 33-Harry Gant
 3-Dale Earnhardt
 21-Neil Bonnett
 27-Rusty Wallace

This was the first race for the new Chevrolet Lumina race car.
This race marked the end of the first tire war, as Hoosier Racing Tire left NASCAR when they could not sell enough tires to be economically viable. Hoosier returned to the Winston Cup Series in 1994, but left for good after that season.
This was Robert Yates Racing's first race victory.
Derrike Cope brings his Purolator sponsorship to the Bob Whitcomb team as their new driver. He was involved in the race's final caution in The Big One crashing out of the race, finishing 30th.

The Winston 

The Winston, an annual all-star race for previous winners and champions along with the winner of the same day Winston Open, was held May 21 at Charlotte Motor Speedway. The No. 11 of Terry Labonte won the pole.

Top Ten Results

 27-Rusty Wallace
 25-Ken Schrader
 3-Dale Earnhardt
 9-Bill Elliott
 7-Alan Kulwicki
 94-Sterling Marlin (Winston Open Winner)
 17-Darrell Waltrip
 26-Ricky Rudd
 5-Geoff Bodine
 88-Greg Sacks

Rusty Wallace spun Darrell Waltrip out of the lead coming to the white flag to earn the victory.  This sparked a fight between Wallace and Waltrip's crew members in the pits before Wallace got to victory lane.

Coca-Cola 600 

The Coca-Cola 600 was held May 28 at Charlotte Motor Speedway. The No. 7 of Alan Kulwicki won the pole.

Top Ten Results

 17-Darrell Waltrip
 94-Sterling Marlin
 25-Ken Schrader
 5-Geoff Bodine
 9-Bill Elliott
 6-Mark Martin
 21-Neil Bonnett
 15-Brett Bodine
 8-Bobby Hillin Jr.
 26-Ricky Rudd

By winning the Daytona 500 earlier in the season, and now the Coca-Cola 600, Waltrip secured a $100,000 bonus for winning two of the Winston Million races, and put himself in position to win the Winston Million later in the season at Darlington.
Kyle Petty drives the number 42 Peak Antifreeze Chevrolet Monte Carlo owned by Rick Hendrick in this race due to Kyle destroying the only car his regular owner Felix Sabates had during the previous weekend on lap 3 of The Winston. He would finish 17th, 8 laps down to the winner.

Budweiser 500 

The Budweiser 500 was held June 4 at Dover Downs International Speedway. Mark Martin won the pole.

Top Ten Results

 3-Dale Earnhardt
 6-Mark Martin
 25-Ken Schrader
 11-Terry Labonte
 27-Rusty Wallace
 26-Ricky Rudd
 21-Neil Bonnett
 9-Bill Elliott
 17-Darrell Waltrip
 55-Phil Parsons

This race marked the debut of Jimmy Spencer in the NASCAR Cup Series driving Buddy Baker's number 88. However it was short lived as he would finish 34th only completing 75 laps due to engine failure.

Banquet Frozen Foods 300 

The inaugural Banquet Frozen Foods 300 was held June 11 at Sears Point Raceway. Rusty Wallace won the pole.

Top Ten Results

 26-Ricky Rudd
 27-Rusty Wallace
 9-Bill Elliott
 3-Dale Earnhardt
 83-Lake Speed
 88-Joe Ruttman
 75-Morgan Shepherd
 4-Rick Wilson
 28-Davey Allison
 30-Michael Waltrip

Mark Martin actually rolled his car during the race due to an error by a new tire changer (only two of the five lug nuts were properly fastened on the car). Right after the car left the pits, the right rear came off, the car spun, hit the tire barrier and rolled onto its roof. However, he came back to finish the race in 31st, 5 laps down.
This would be Buick's penultimate victory in the NASCAR Cup Series.

Miller High Life 500 

The Miller High Life 500 was held June 18 at Pocono International Raceway. The No. 27 of Rusty Wallace won the pole. This race was one of the few races telecast on Pay Per View.

Top Ten Results

 11-Terry Labonte
 33-Harry Gant
 3-Dale Earnhardt
 25-Ken Schrader
 75-Morgan Shepherd
 94-Sterling Marlin
 29-Dale Jarrett
 21-Neil Bonnett
 16-Larry Pearson
 15-Brett Bodine

This was the first victory for Junior Johnson's team using a Ford since the 1969 American 500 at Rockingham.

Miller High Life 400 (Michigan) 

The Miller High Life 400 was held June 25 at Michigan International Speedway. The No. 25 of Ken Schrader won the pole.

Top Ten Results

 9-Bill Elliott
 27-Rusty Wallace
 17-Darrell Waltrip
 26-Ricky Rudd
 15-Brett Bodine
 4-Rick Wilson
 83-Lake Speed
 94-Sterling Marlin
 10-Derrike Cope
 42-Kyle Petty

Pepsi 400 

The Pepsi 400 was held July 1 at Daytona International Speedway.  The No. 6 of Mark Martin won the pole.

Top Ten Results

 28-Davey Allison
 75-Morgan Shepherd
 55-Phil Parsons
 9-Bill Elliott
 7-Alan Kulwicki
 11-Terry Labonte
 94-Sterling Marlin
 84-Dick Trickle
 26-Ricky Rudd
 57-Hut Stricklin

This was first time the Pepsi 400 was aired on ESPN. The race was shown flag-to-flag, but on same-day tape delay. Previously, the Pepsi/Firecracker 400 was aired as part of ABC's Wide World of Sports and only highlights of the race would air.
This race featured a rollover crash involving the No. 83 of Lake Speed on lap 144.

AC Spark Plug 500 

The AC Spark Plug 500 was held on July 23 at Pocono International Raceway.  Ken Schrader won the pole.  

Top Ten Finishers

 9-Bill Elliott
 27-Rusty Wallace
 6-Mark Martin
 17-Darrell Waltrip
 28-Davey Allison
 33-Harry Gant
 25-Ken Schrader
 75-Morgan Shepherd
 3-Dale Earnhardt
 15-Brett Bodine

This race was notable for two wrecks that tore open portions of the track's boilerplate walls.  Jimmy Horton crashed in Turn Two and tore open a hole in the wall.  Later a big wreck erupted in Turn One involving Greg Sacks in the Tom Winkle No. 48 and the No. 83 of Lake Speed.  The two cars got together going into Turn One and smashed into the boilerplate wall head-on.  The hit punched open the wall and sent Sacks flipping.  The yellow remained out for the duration of time needed to repair the wall.  Speed broke his shoulder in the crash and had to sit out for a couple weeks.
Elliott cut a tire on the opening lap but rallied to take the lead from Wallace in the final ten laps.  The win tied Elliott with Tim Richmond for most wins at Pocono.  Richmond, battling illness, was the subject of a short retrospective piece on the ESPN telecast and former Richmond crew chiefs Barry Dodson and Harry Hyde were interviewed on-air about him.

Talladega DieHard 500 

The Talladega DieHard 500 was held July 30 at Alabama International Motor Speedway. Mark Martin won the pole.

Top Ten Results

 11-Terry Labonte
 17-Darrell Waltrip
 6-Mark Martin
 25-Ken Schrader
 4-Rick Wilson
 75-Morgan Shepherd
 42-Kyle Petty
 33-Harry Gant
 28-Davey Allison
 21-Neil Bonnett

Joe Ruttman substituted for Lake Speed in the No. 83, and crashed spectacularly on lap 145.  Ruttman hit the wall nearly head-on and almost got on his side as a result.

Budweiser at the Glen 

The Budweiser at the Glen was held August 13 at Watkins Glen International. Morgan Shepherd won the pole. 

Top Ten Results

 27-Rusty Wallace
 6-Mark Martin
 3-Dale Earnhardt
 28-Davey Allison
 8-Bobby Hillin Jr.
 75-Morgan Shepherd
 94-Sterling Marlin
 4-Rick Wilson
 44-Jim Sauter
 30-Michael Waltrip

Eddie Bierschwale was the substitute driver in the No. 83 for Lake Speed, who was still recovering from his shoulder injury at Pocono.  He finished 38th.
This race is notable for a big wreck on lap 89 involving the No. 5 of Geoff Bodine.  Bodine lost a tire at the end of the backstraight, spun around and went through the barrier and hitting a fence behind the barrier (more or less marking off the property line of Watkins Glen International's land). Bodine was uninjured.
Also on this day, Tim Richmond who had a long battle with AIDS, died earlier in the day.

Champion Spark Plug 400 

The Champion Spark Plug 400 was held August 20 at Michigan International Speedway. Geoff Bodine won the pole.

Top Ten Results

 27-Rusty Wallace
 75-Morgan Shepherd
 33-Harry Gant
 57-Hut Stricklin
 5-Geoff Bodine
 10-Derrike Cope
 28-Davey Allison
 26-Ricky Rudd
 6-Mark Martin
 7-Alan Kulwicki

Busch 500 

The Busch 500 was held August 26 at Bristol International Raceway. Alan Kulwicki won the pole.

Top Ten Results

 17-Darrell Waltrip
 7-Alan Kulwicki
 26-Ricky Rudd
 33-Harry Gant
 11-Terry Labonte
 27-Rusty Wallace
 8-Bobby Hillin Jr.
 88-Jimmy Spencer
 21-Neil Bonnett
 29-Dale Jarrett

Failed to qualify: 43-Richard Petty

This was the fourth race that Petty failed to qualify. In response to fan complaints about Petty missing several races, NASCAR introduced the past champion's provisional in 1991.
Fortunately, this would be the last DNQ for Richard Petty before his retirement in 1992.

Heinz Southern 500 

The Heinz Southern 500 was held September 3 at Darlington Raceway. The No. 7 of Alan Kulwicki won the pole.

Top Ten Results

 3-Dale Earnhardt
 6-Mark Martin
 26-Ricky Rudd
 27-Rusty Wallace
 25-Ken Schrader
 33-Harry Gant
 9-Bill Elliott
 8-Bobby Hillin Jr.
 75-Morgan Shepherd
 94-Sterling Marlin

Darrell Waltrip had a chance to win the Winston Million at Darlington, but hit the wall early in the race and finished 22nd.
Rodney Combs replaced Joe Ruttman as Lake Speed's substitute driver in the No. 83 at Darlington.  He finished 23rd.

Miller High Life 400 (Richmond) 

The Miller High Life 400 was held September 10 at Richmond International Raceway. The No. 9 of Bill Elliott won the pole.

Top Ten Results

 27-Rusty Wallace
 3-Dale Earnhardt
 5-Geoff Bodine
 26-Ricky Rudd
 33-Harry Gant
 17-Darrell Waltrip
 21-Neil Bonnett
 84-Dick Trickle
 57-Hut Stricklin
 28-Davey Allison

Lake Speed returned to the No. 83 at Richmond after sitting out 5 races due to injury.
Lennie Pond retired after this race.

Peak Performance 500 

The Peak Performance 500 was held September 17 at Dover Downs International Speedway. The No. 28 of Davey Allison won the pole.

Top Ten Results

 3-Dale Earnhardt
 6-Mark Martin
 25-Ken Schrader
 9-Bill Elliott
 26-Ricky Rudd
 30-Michael Waltrip
 27-Rusty Wallace
 10-Derrike Cope
 15-Brett Bodine
 88-Jimmy Spencer

The race was red-flagged briefly because of a crash involving Neil Bonnett. Bonnett, who broke his sternum in the incident, was forced to sit out the next three races. The reason for the delay was to clear the track to allow for an ambulance to transport Bonnett out of the speedway to a local hospital.

Goody's 500 

The Goody's 500 was held September 24 at Martinsville Speedway. Dale Earnhardt started on the pole, which was actually won by Jimmy Hensley (as a substitute driver) as Earnhardt and others could not reach the track in time due to Hurricane Hugo, which affected the area.

Top Ten Results

 17-Darrell Waltrip
 33-Harry Gant
 84-Dick Trickle
 27-Rusty Wallace
 29-Dale Jarrett
 2-Ernie Irvan
 15-Brett Bodine
 26-Ricky Rudd
 3-Dale Earnhardt
 25-Ken Schrader

Tommy Ellis substituted for Neil Bonnett in the No. 21 in this race, and the next 2 events in Charlotte and North Wilkesboro.

All Pro Auto Parts 500 

The All Pro Auto Parts 500 was held October 8 at Charlotte Motor Speedway. Bill Elliott won the pole.

Top Ten Results

 25-Ken Schrader
 33-Harry Gant
 6-Mark Martin
 9-Bill Elliott
 28-Davey Allison
 10-Derrike Cope
 94-Sterling Marlin
 27-Rusty Wallace -1
 8-Bobby Hillin Jr. -2
 75-Morgan Shepherd -2

Failed to qualify: 14-A. J. Foyt*

Foyt was involved in a practice crash where he suffered a significant concussion which kept him from attempting to qualify.
Dale Earnhardt lost the points lead in this race when the camshaft in his No. 3 Chevrolet broke in the 13th lap, and he dropped out.

Holly Farms 400 

The Holly Farms 400 was held October 15 at North Wilkesboro Speedway. Dale Earnhardt won the pole. 

Top Ten Results

 5-Geoff Bodine
 6-Mark Martin
 11-Terry Labonte
 33-Harry Gant
 75-Morgan Shepherd
 9-Bill Elliott
 27-Rusty Wallace
 2-Ernie Irvan
 26-Ricky Rudd
 3-Dale Earnhardt

This race was notable for the race for the win between Earnhardt and Ricky Rudd. On the last lap, Earnhardt and Rudd touched in turn 1, spinning both cars out. This allowed Geoff Bodine to slip by and win the race, and allowed Rusty Wallace to gain points on Earnhardt for the championship hunt.
 This was Bodine's first win since the 1988 Miller High Life 500 at Pocono. Bodine led only the final lap of the race while Dale Earnhardt dominated, leading 343 of the 400 laps. This was also Geoff Bodine's final win in a Chevrolet and with Hendrick Motorsports. Geoff would leave the #5 Levi Garrett Chevrolet Lumina to go drive the #11 Budweiser Ford Thunderbird for the next 2 years (1990-1991) with Junior Johnson & Associates.

AC Delco 500 

The AC Delco 500 was held October 22 at North Carolina Motor Speedway. Alan Kulwicki won the pole.

Top Ten Results

 6-Mark Martin*
 27-Rusty Wallace
 17-Darrell Waltrip
 25-Ken Schrader
 84-Dick Trickle
 21-Neil Bonnett*
 5-Geoff Bodine
 8-Bobby Hillin Jr.
 7-Alan Kulwicki
 42-Kyle Petty

This was Martin's first career Winston Cup victory.
This was Bonnett's first race back from his sternum injury that he suffered at Dover.

Autoworks 500 

The Autoworks 500 was held November 5 at Phoenix International Raceway. Ken Schrader won the pole.

Top Ten Results

 9-Bill Elliott
 11-Terry Labonte
 6-Mark Martin
 17-Darrell Waltrip
 29-Dale Jarrett
 3-Dale Earnhardt
 84-Dick Trickle
 33-Harry Gant
 30-Michael Waltrip
 88-Jimmy Spencer

Failed to qualify:  18-Tommy Ellis, 41-Danny Lawson, 89-Bob Howard, 35-Keith van Houten, 07-Mark Walbridge, 44-Jack Sellers, 19-Robert Sprague, 24-Butch Gilliland, 22-St. James Davis, 80-Bob Walker, 08-Rick McCray, 99-John Krebs, 38-Duke Hoenshell, 04-Hershel McGriff, 50-Rick Scribner

Two cars entered by Hendrick Motorsports (the No. 46 City Chevrolet driven by Greg Sacks and the No. 51 Exxon Chevrolet driven by Bobby Hamilton) were entered to get in-race footage for the 1990 film Days of Thunder. Hamilton actually led the race with 100 laps to go (in his first career start) before the engine blew. A third movie car (the No. 18 Hardee's Chevrolet driven by Tommy Ellis) failed to make the race.

Atlanta Journal 500 

The Atlanta Journal 500 was held November 19 at Atlanta Motor Speedway. The No. 7 of Alan Kulwicki won the pole. 

Top Ten Results

 3-Dale Earnhardt
 5-Geoff Bodine
 94-Sterling Marlin
 25-Ken Schrader
 17-Darrell Waltrip
 42-Kyle Petty
 8-Bobby Hillin Jr.
 75-Morgan Shepherd
 21-Neil Bonnett
 83-Lake Speed

Three drivers entered the race mathematically eligible for the Winston Cup championship. Rusty Wallace had a 78-point lead over Mark Martin, and a 79-point lead over third-place Dale Earnhardt. Wallace had to finish 18th or better to clinch the title, but went into the race proclaiming he was going to 'run as hard as he could.' The statement was seen as a thinly veiled criticism of Bill Elliott whom Wallace lost the championship to a year earlier, in a similar situation. In that year, Elliott elected to drive a very conservative race, easily clinching the title, much to the ire of the hard-charging Wallace. Dale Earnhardt qualified 3rd, Wallace qualified 4th, but Martin would start back in 20th.

Despite his plan to race all-out, Wallace encountered problems that complicated his day. On the first round of pit stops, he pitted under green but lost a lap when the caution came out shortly thereafter. Later, he suffered a flat tire and fell all the way back to the 33rd position. Wallace slowly and steadily worked his way back up the standings. Dale Earnhardt, meanwhile, dominated the race leading 294 of the 328 laps en route to victory. Mark Martin, the other driver in the mix for the championship did not end up being a factor. He dropped out on lap 224 with a blown engine that resulted in a fire. In the closing laps, Wallace was three laps down in 15th place, just barely holding on to the hypothetical points lead. Wallace managed to finish the race in 15th, and won the Winston Cup championship by a mere 12 points over Earnhardt. It was Wallace's first and only Winston Cup championship, and the first championship in the modern era for Pontiac.

On lap 203, Grant Adcox struck the wall and suffered a heart attack and severe head injuries. Adcox died shortly after the accident.
Final career top 10 for Neil Bonnett.

Full Drivers' Championship

(key) Bold – Pole position awarded by time. Italics – Pole position set by owner's points. * – Most laps led.

Rookie of the Year 

Dick Trickle was named the 1989 Winston Cup Rookie of the Year, despite entering the competition in the second week of the season, replacing Mike Alexander at Stavola Brothers Racing. The top runner-up was former Dash champion Hut Stricklin, driving for returning car owner Rod Osterlund. Two-time Busch champion Larry Pearson and former modified driver Jimmy Spencer were the only other candidates to make a full schedule, as Rick Mast, Ben Hess, Chad Little, Butch Miller, and Mickey Gibbs all ran part-time.

See also
1989 NASCAR Busch Series

References

External links 
Winston Cup Standings and Statistics for 1989

 
NASCAR Cup Series seasons